Valeree Siow Zi Xuan (born 18 March 2002) is a Malaysian badminton player who specialises in the women's doubles and mixed doubles events.

Career

2021 
2021 was a fruitful year for Siow. She clinched three titles in Women's doubles with her partner Low Yeen Yuan in the Slovenia International, Latvia International and Hellas International. She also cliched three titles in mixed doubles with Yap Roy King in the Latvia International, Hellas International and Ukraine International. She was named as Chan Peng Soon's new mixed doubles partner after Chan split up for good with Goh Liu Ying and rejoined the Badminton Association of Malaysia.

2022 
Siow's debut tournament with Chan was at the India Open 2022 in New Delhi. They were eliminated by 2nd seeds Rodion Alimov and Alina Davletova of Russia in the quarterfinals with a score of 14-21, 13-21.

Personal life 
Siow's sister Desiree Siow Hao Shan is also a badminton player specialising in the women's and mixed doubles events. She is currently pursuing a Bachelor's degree in Sports Science at the University of Malaya.

Achievements

BWF International Challenge/Series (6 titles) 
Women's doubles

Mixed doubles

  BWF International Challenge tournament
  BWF International Series tournament
  BWF Future Series tournament

References

External link 
 

2002 births
Living people
People from Perak
Malaysian sportspeople of Chinese descent
Malaysian female badminton players
21st-century Malaysian women